Aksay is a town in north-western Kazakhstan. It is the administrative center of Borili District in West Kazakhstan Region. Population:  

It is an important oil and gas town, serving as an operational base for the nearby Karachaganak Field.

Climate
Aksay has a hot-summer humid continental climate (Köppen climate classification Dfa).

References

Populated places in West Kazakhstan Region